Yakobi is a town and ward in Njombe district in the Njombe Region of the Tanzanian Southern Highlands. Its population, according to the 2002 Tanzanian census, is 5,904.

References

Wards of Iringa Region